Penicillium simile is a species of fungus in the genus Penicillium.

References 

simile
Fungi described in 2011